Cangas may refer to:

Places
 Cangas, Pontevedra, a town and municipality in Galicia, Spain
 Cangas de Onís, a municipality in Asturias, Spain
 Cangas del Narcea, a municipality in Asturias, Spain
 Cangas del Narcea (parish), capital of the municipality

Other uses
 Cangas (Vino de la Tierra), a Spanish appellation for Vino de Calidad wines from Asturias
 Canga's bead symptom, the irregular appearance of uterus and nodular structures in tuba uterina observed in patients with genital tuberculosis
 CB Cangas, a handball club based in Cangas, Pontevedra
 Johan de Cangas (fl. 13th century), Spanish troubadour

See also
 Canga (disambiguation)